Roby Smith (born 1977) is an American businessman and politician from Iowa. He is currently serving as Treasurer of Iowa since 2023. He previously was elected to the Iowa Senate in 2010, and represented District 47. He headed the State Government Committee.

He is a small business owner, and holds a Business degree from Concordia University. He is an Eagle Scout recipient, and supporter of the Boy Scouts of America. Prior to being elected to the state senate, he unsuccessfully ran for a seat in the Iowa House of Representatives in 2006.

He defeated Michael Fitzgerald, a Democrat who had held the office of the Treasurer of Iowa since 1983.

Notes

External links

Iowa State Treasurer
Campaign website

|-

 

 

1969 births
21st-century American politicians
Concordia University Nebraska alumni
Republican Party Iowa state senators
Living people
State treasurers of Iowa